Multiclavula is a genus of basidiolichens in the family Hydnaceae. The widespread genus contains 14 species.

Species
Multiclavula caput-serpentis 
Multiclavula clara 
Multiclavula constans 
Multiclavula coronilla 
Multiclavula corynoides 
Multiclavula delicata 
Multiclavula hastula 
Multiclavula ichthyiformis  – Costa Rica
Multiclavula mucida 
Multiclavula petricola  – Japan
Multiclavula pogonati 
Multiclavula samuelsii  – New Zealand
Multiclavula sharpii 
Multiclavula vernalis 

Several species once classified in Multiclavula have since been transferred to other genera. These include:
Multiclavula afflata  = Lentaria afflata
Multiclavula akagerae  = Ertzia akagerae
Multiclavula calocera  = Lepidostroma calocerum
Multiclavula fossicola  = Sulzbacheromyces fossicolus
Multiclavula rugaramae  = Lepidostroma rugaramae
Multiclavula sinensis  = Sulzbacheromyces sinensis

References

Hydnaceae
Lichen genera
Agaricomycetes genera
Taxa named by Ron Petersen
Basidiolichens
Taxa described in 1967